Drama is the second Mandarin solo mini album by Aaron Yan of Taiwanese Mandopop quartet boy band Fahrenheit. It was released by HIM International Music on 30 May 2014. The EP consists of six songs performed by Yan.

Track listing

Music videos

References

2014 EPs
Mandopop EPs
HIM International Music albums
Aaron Yan albums